Duncan Smith may refer to:

 Duncan Smith (Australian politician) (1890–1973), Australian politician
 Duncan Smith (Irish politician) (born 1983), Irish Labour politician
 Duncan Smith (footballer) (born 1929), Scottish footballer
 Duncan J. D. Smith (born 1960), British travel writer, photographer, historian, and explorer
 Duncan Smith (cricketer), British cricket player

See also
 Iain Duncan Smith (born 1954), British Conservative politician
 William Duncan Smith (1825–1862), United States Army officer who fought in the Mexican–American War
 W. G. G. Duncan Smith (1914–1996), British Royal Air Force Second World War Flying ace
 George Smith Duncan (1852–1930), tramway and mining engineer best known for his work on cable trams